Vərov (also, Varov and Vyarov) is a village and municipality in the Yardymli Rayon of Azerbaijan. It has a population of 563. The municipality consists of the villages of Vərov and Zəngələ.

References 

Populated places in Yardimli District